A tide mill or tidal mill is a type of watermill which relies on tidal power, the rise and fall of the tides.

Tide Mill or similar may also refer to:

 Tidemill, Gloucester County, Virginia, an unincorporated community in Gloucester County, Virginia, USA
 Tide Mills, East Sussex, England, UK; a derelict village

See also
 List of watermills in the United Kingdom
 
 Mill (disambiguation)